Kandakli (also Romanized as Kandaklī and Kaandakali; also known as Kandkali and Kendikli) is a village in Sarakhs Rural District, in the Central District of Sarakhs County, Razavi Khorasan Province, Iran. At the 2006 census, its population was 1,507, in 355 families.

References 

Populated places in Sarakhs County